Amel is a municipality and village in the German-speaking Community of Belgium.

Amel may also refer to:

 Amel (name)
 Amelogenin (AMELY and AMELX), sex determining DNA chromosomal markers
 Amel (river), a Belgian river also known as Amblève
 Amel (UAV), a drone
 Amel Yachts
 Amel Association International, a Lebanese non-profit non-governmental organization